As of 2018, five firms in France rank among the world's biggest publishers of books in terms of revenue: , Groupe Albin Michel, Groupe Madrigall (including Éditions Gallimard), Hachette Livre (including Éditions Grasset), and Martinière Groupe (including Éditions du Seuil).

History

In 1292 the book-trade of Paris consisted of 24 copyists, 17 bookbinders, 19 parchment makers, 13 illuminators, 8 dealers in manuscripts.

In Paris in 1470, Martin Crantz, Michael Freyburger, and Ulrich Gering produced the first printed book in France, Epistolae (letters), by Gasparinus de Bergamo. In 1476 in Lyon appeared one of the first printed French-language books, La Légende Dorée (Golden Legend) by Jacobus de Voragine.

The French royal library began at the Louvre Palace  in 1368 during the reign of Charles V, opened to the public in 1692, and became the Bibliothèque nationale de France in 1792. The Centre National du Livre (Center for the Book) formed in 1946. The  began in 1981.

The history of the book in France has been studied from a variety of cultural, economic, political, and social angles. Influential scholars include Roger Chartier, Robert Darnton, Elizabeth Eisenstein, and Henri-Jean Martin.

Bookselling

The  (book trade union) organized in 1847 in Paris, and the Syndicat National de la Librairie Ancienne et Moderne booksellers association in 1914.

L'Express started a bestseller list in 1961, and  started one in 1984.

In popular culture
 The Reader (1988 film)
 Hugo (film), 2011, includes brief scene in fictional Paris bookshop

See also
 Collection (publishing)
 Copyright law of France
 Legal deposit: France
 Media of France
 French literature
 French bibliophiles
 
 Libraries in Paris
 List of book fairs in France (in French)
 List of book-burning incidents, some in France
 French children's books
 Musée de l'Imprimerie (printing museum), Lyon, est. 1964

Notes

References

This article incorporates information from the French Wikipedia.

Bibliography

in English
 
 
 
 
 
 
 Printing in France before 1501, p.342+
 16th Century: France
 17th Century: France
 18th Century: France
  
  
 
  ("What did the French read in the eighteenth century?")
 
  + Volumes 3-4 (2011): Books published in France before 1601 in Latin and Languages other than French

in French
  1811-
  1971-

Images

External links

  (Bibliography of editions published in France; also browsable by town)
 Institut d'histoire du livre (Institute for the History of the Book), Lyon, est. 2001
 . (Includes some info on France)
  (Includes books)
 
  (Bibliography)

france
Book publishing in France
 
Libraries in France